Desirae Krawczyk and Giuliana Olmos were the defending champions, but Krawczyk chose not to participate. Olmos partnered alongside Alexa Guarachi but lost in the first round to Harriet Dart and Heather Watson.

Nao Hibino and Miyu Kato won the title, defeating Naomi Broady and Erin Routliffe in the final, 6–2, 6–2.

Seeds

Draw

Draw

References

External Links
Main Draw

Odlum Brown Vancouver Open - Doubles
Vancouver Open